Aleš Kisý (born 30 September 1980) is a Czech Paralympic athlete. He has represented Czech Republic at the Paralympics on five occasions in 2004, 2008, 2012, 2016 and 2020.

Biogrpahy 
In August 1999, he met with a tragic incident as he slipped accidentally when he attempted to jump into a swimming pool and it ultimately resulted in quadriplegia. He also damaged his cervical spine.

Career 
Ales took up the sport of shot put in 2003. He was selected as one of the athletes to represent Czech Republic at the 2004 Summer Paralympics, just one year after taking the sport. During the 2004 Summer Paralympics, he competed in both discus throw and shot put events. He also competed in javelin throw event at the 2012 Summer Paralympics

He has also played wheelchair rugby at club level. He was named as the Czech Para athlete of the Year in 2018.

He clinched bronze medal at the age of 40 in the men's F53 shot put event during the 2020 Summer Paralympics. It was also his first Paralympic medal in five Paralympic attempts.

References 

1980 births
Living people
Czech male shot putters
Czech male discus throwers
Czech male javelin throwers
Paralympic bronze medalists for the Czech Republic
Athletes (track and field) at the 2004 Summer Paralympics
Athletes (track and field) at the 2008 Summer Paralympics
Athletes (track and field) at the 2012 Summer Paralympics
Athletes (track and field) at the 2016 Summer Paralympics
Athletes (track and field) at the 2020 Summer Paralympics
Paralympic athletes of the Czech Republic
Paralympic medalists in athletics (track and field)
Medalists at the 2020 Summer Paralympics
Medalists at the World Para Athletics European Championships
People from Trutnov
Sportspeople from the Hradec Králové Region